CGN may refer to:

 CGN, a gene that encodes for the protein cingulin
 Ceredigion, formerly Cardiganshire, historic county in Wales, Chapman code
 China General Nuclear Power Group, a Chinese energy company
 Compagnie Générale de Navigation sur le lac Léman, a Swiss company operating boats on Lake Léman
 Childhood gender nonconformity, a childhood behavioral pattern
 CGN, IATA code for Cologne Bonn Airport, Germany
 CGN, National Rail station code for Cogan railway station, Wales
 CGN, U.S. Navy designation for a nuclear-powered guided missile cruiser
 Carrier-grade NAT, an approach to IPv4 network design where end sites are configured with private network addresses
 CGN, cis Golgi network, compartment of the Golgi apparatus
Crescentic glomerulonephritis, a syndrome of the kidney that is characterized by a rapid loss of kidney function

 CGN, Computer Glitch Ninjas, A computer hardware and software hacker collective.